A robot is a virtual or mechanical artificial agent, usually an electro-mechanical machine.

Robot or Robots may also refer to:

Computing
 Internet robot, an automated computer program that runs tasks on the Internet
 Robot Framework, a generic test automation framework for acceptance testing and acceptance test-driven development (ATDD)
 Robots exclusion standard, a World Wide Web protocol
 Return Of Bleichenbacher's Oracle Threat (ROBOT) attack, see Adaptive chosen-ciphertext attack

Film and television
 Robots (1988 film) a television film 
 Robots (2005 film), an American animated film based on the children's book by William Joyce
 Robots (upcoming film), an upcoming American film starring Shailene Woodley
 Enthiran, a 2010 Indian Tamil-language feature film, titled Robot in Hindi
 Enthiran (soundtrack)
 "Robot" (Doctor Who), a serial on Doctor Who
 "Robot" (The Goodies), an episode of The Goodies
 "The Robots" (Code Lyoko), an episode of Code Lyoko
 Robot (Lost in Space), also known as The Robot or Robot B-9, a character from the sci-fi television show Lost in Space
 Mr. Robot, a television series

Music
 Robot (dance)
 Robot (album), an album by Nikos Karvelas
 Robot, an album by 3OH!3
 Robot Face, or <|°_°|>, an album by Caravan Palace

Songs
 "Robot" (CNBLUE song)
 "Robots" (song), a song by Kate Ryan
 "The Robots", a song by Kraftwerk
 "Robot", a song by Miley Cyrus from Can't Be Tamed
 "Robot", a song by the Futureheads from The Futureheads
 "Robot", a song by Nada Surf from The Proximity Effect
 "Robots", a song by Gabriella Cilmi from Ten
 "Robots", a song by Flight of the Conchords from The Distant Future
 "Robots", a song by TV on the Radio from OK Calculator
 "Robot", a song by Getter Janni from Rockefeller Street

Publications
 Robot Magazine
 Robot series (Asimov), a series of novels and short stories by Isaac Asimov
 Robot: Super Color Comic, a manga series

Video games
 Robots (1984 video game), a computer game originally developed for Unix
 Robots (2005 video game), a video game based on the animated film
 Robot (video game series), a series of NES games that used the Robotic Operating Buddy accessory
 Robot Entertainment, an American video game development company
 "The Robot", a nickname given to professional Super Smash Bros. player Jason Zimmerman

Other uses
 Robot (camera)
 Robot Communications, a Japanese independent animation and visual effects studio 
 Robot Patent, a historical labour rent in the Habsburg Empire
 Operation ROBOT, a 1952 plan to float the pound
 Traffic light (robot in South African English) a signaling device positioned at a road intersection

People with the surname
 Alexandru Robot (1916–), Bessarabian writer
 Isidore Robot (1837–1887), French Roman Catholic missionary

See also

 Android (disambiguation)
 Bot (disambiguation)
 I, Robot (disambiguation)
 List of Robots
 Metalmen (disambiguation)
 Robo (disambiguation)
 Robot in the Family, a 1994 American comedy film
 Robotman (disambiguation)
 Robot Series (disambiguation)
 Robot Wars (disambiguation)